The Ambassador of the Italian Republic to Germany (Italian: Italienischer Botschafter in Deutschland) is the official representative of the government of Italy to the German government. The incumbent ambassador is Armando Varricchio, appointed on 21 June 2021. The ambassador is based at the Embassy of Italy, Berlin.

The ambassador has their offices in Berlin at 1 Hiroshimastraße.

References 

 
Germany
Italy